The 19th Metro Manila Film Festival was held in 1993.

Reyna Films' Kung Mawawala Ka Pa and Star Cinema's May Minamahal shared top honors in the 1993 Metro Manila Film Festival. Kung Mawawala Ka Pa was awarded Best Picture and received seven other awards including the Best Actress for Dawn Zulueta among others. On the other hand, May Minamahal won nine awards including the Best Actor for the second consecutive time winner Aga Muhlach, Best Director for Jose Javier Reyes, Second Best Picture, and the coveted Gatpuno Antonio J. Villegas Cultural Awards among others.

This year's festival was also the first to feature short films as part of their Short Film Endowment Program, which was organized in collaboration with Mowelfund Film Institute.

Entries

Short Film Endowment Program 
 Anak Maynila - Nonoy Dadivas (6 min)
 The Good Kisser of Manila - Joey Tam (14 min)
 Isaak - Nick Deocampo (10 min)
 Kamagong - Fruto Corre 
 Nene - Grace Amilbangsa
 Kanlungan - Robert Quebral

Winners and nominees

Awards
Winners are listed first and highlighted in boldface.

Multiple awards

Controversies

Winners' list leakage
During the "Gabi ng Parangal" held in the PICC Plenary Hall, December 27 of Monday night, a supposed leakage of the list of winners marred that year's awards presentation.

References

External links

1993
1993 film awards
1993 in Philippine cinema
December 1993 events in Asia
January 1994 events in Asia